Dielma is a Gram-positive and anaerobic genus from the family of Erysipelotrichidae with one known species (Dielma fastidiosa). Dielma fastidiosa has been isolated from human feces from Dielmo in Senegal.

References 

Erysipelotrichia
Bacteria genera
Taxa described in 2016
Monotypic bacteria genera